= Iraqi Democrats Against Occupation =

Iraqi Democrats Against Occupation (formerly Iraqi Democrats Against War and Sanctions) is an Iraqi political organisation founded to oppose United States-sponsored economic sanctions. It has now turned its focus to the current occupation of Iraq, calling for the immediate withdrawal of all foreign troops and the establishment of a democratic government.
